Santiago Soler y Pla (12 March 1839, in Barcelona, Spain – 1888) was a Spanish politician who served as Minister of State in 1873, during the presidency of Nicolás Salmerón of the First Spanish Republic. Soler held other important offices such as Mayor of Barcelona in 1869.

References
www.xtec.es Santiago Soler y Pla

|-
 

Foreign ministers of Spain
1839 births
1888 deaths
Government ministers during the First Spanish Republic